Union Mills is an unincorporated community in Fluvanna County, in the U.S. state of Virginia.

In the mid-19th century, it was a point along the stagecoach route between Richmond and Staunton.

References

Unincorporated communities in Virginia
Unincorporated communities in Fluvanna County, Virginia